For the defunct federal electoral district, see Mississauga West

Mississauga West was a provincial electoral district in Ontario, Canada, that was represented in the Legislative Assembly of Ontario from 1987 to 2007.

From 1987 to 1999 Mississauga West consisted of the part of the City of Mississauga between the Queen Elizabeth Way on the south, Eglinton Avenue on the north and Hurontario Street, Central Parkway and Cawthra Road on the east.

From 1999 to 2007 Mississauga West consisted of the part of the City of Mississauga lying of north of Dundas Street West west of the Credit River, the 403 and  the Erin Mills Parkway, south of the 401.

The electoral district was abolished in 2003 when it was re-distributed between Mississauga South, Mississauga—Erindale and Mississauga—Streetsville ridings.

Members of Provincial Parliament

Election results

1999-2007

1987-1999

External links
 Elections Ontario  1999 results and 2003 results

Former provincial electoral districts of Ontario
Politics of Mississauga